Abdul Razak Mohammed Ekpoki (born 27 October 1982, in Kano, Nigeria) is a retired Nigerian football retired striker who last played for NK Rovinj.

Career
He started his career in Nigeria playing with Kano Pillars and Plateau United before moving to Egypt in 2000. and winning Egyptian Premier League title in 2003. with Ismaily. 
In 2003. he joined Malaysian club from Seremban  Negeri Sembilan FA, after a successful year in Malaysia Ekpoki moved to Slovenia to start his European career with NK Ljubljana.
Following some good matches in Slovenia he was noticed by Spanish manager who took him to Spain to join squad of Gimnàstic de Tarragona in Catalonia, Spain which that year 2005-2006 got promoted to Liga football Primera after 56 years. Year later Ekpoki re-enforced UD Vecindario a team from Canary Islands . 
Afterwards he played with HIT Gorica again in Slovenia. 
In summer 2008 he signed a contract until 30 June 2008 with K.A.A. Gent of the Belgium Jupiler League. He also played with Slovenian NK Drava Ptuj before moving to Vietnam and playing with V-League club Sông Lam Nghệ An. He played ten league games scoring five goals. He also played the FA Cup final where he scored the only goal that saw Sông Lam winning the Vietnamese cup in 2010. He remained in Vietnam before moving back to his family in Europe. He resurfaced in Croatia, joining the ranks of the Treća HNL Zapad team NK Rovinj near the end of 2013.

He is nicknamed Razak.

External links
 Stats from Slovenia at Prvaliga.

1982 births
Living people
Sportspeople from Kano State
Nigerian footballers
Nigerian expatriate footballers
Association football forwards
Plateau United F.C. players
Negeri Sembilan FA players
Kano Pillars F.C. players
Ismaily SC players
Expatriate footballers in Egypt
Expatriate footballers in Malaysia
NK Ljubljana players
ND Gorica players
Slovenian PrvaLiga players
NK Drava Ptuj players
Expatriate footballers in Slovenia
UD Vecindario players
Gimnàstic de Tarragona footballers
Expatriate footballers in Spain
K.A.A. Gent players
Belgian Pro League players
Expatriate footballers in Belgium
Expatriate footballers in Vietnam
Nigerian expatriate sportspeople in Vietnam
Nigerian expatriate sportspeople in Malaysia
Nigerian expatriate sportspeople in Egypt
Nigerian expatriate sportspeople in Slovenia
Egyptian Premier League players
NK Rovinj players